The boys' monobob competition of the bobsleigh events at the 2016 Winter Youth Olympics was held at the Lillehammer Olympic Bobsleigh and Luge Track, on 20 February. 15 athletes from 15 different countries took part in this event.

Results
The race was started at 14:00.

References

Boys' monobob